Henry William Paget, 1st Marquess of Anglesey  (17 May 1768 – 29 April 1854), styled Lord Paget between 1784 and 1812 and known as the Earl of Uxbridge between 1812 and 1815, was a British Army officer and politician. After serving as a member of parliament for Carnarvon and then for Milborne Port, he took part in the Flanders Campaign and then commanded the cavalry for Sir John Moore's army in Spain during the Peninsular War; his cavalry showed distinct superiority over their French counterparts at the Battle of Sahagún and at the Battle of Benavente, where he defeated the elite chasseurs of the French Imperial Guard. During the Hundred Days he led the charge of the heavy cavalry against Comte d'Erlon's column at the Battle of Waterloo. At the end of the battle, he lost part of one leg to a cannonball. In later life he served twice as Master-General of the Ordnance and twice as Lord Lieutenant of Ireland.

Background, education and politics
He was born Henry Bayley, the eldest son of Henry Bayley-Paget, 1st Earl of Uxbridge and his wife Jane (née Champagné), daughter of the Very Reverend Arthur Champagné, Dean of Clonmacnoise, Ireland. His father assumed the surname Paget in 1770. He was educated at Westminster School and Christ Church, Oxford.

Paget entered parliament at the 1790 general election as member for Carnarvon, a seat he held until the 1796 general election when his brother Edward was elected unopposed in his place. He then represented Milborne Port from 1796 until he resigned his seat in 1804 by appointment as Steward of the Chiltern Hundreds, and again from the 1806 election to January 1810, when he took the Chiltern Hundreds again.

Military career

At the outbreak of the French Revolutionary Wars, Paget raised a regiment of Staffordshire volunteers and was given the temporary rank of lieutenant-colonel-commandant in December 1793. As the 80th Regiment of Foot, the unit took part in the Flanders Campaign of 1794 under Paget's command. He was formally commissioned into the British Army as a lieutenant in the 7th Regiment of Foot on 14 April 1795 and received rapid promotion, first to captain in the 23rd Regiment of Foot, also on 14 April 1795, then to major in the 65th Regiment of Foot, on 19 May 1795 and then to lieutenant-colonel in the 80th Regiment of Foot on 30 May 1795. He transferred to the command of the 16th Light Dragoons on 15 June 1795. Promoted to colonel on 3 May 1796, he was given command of the 7th Light Dragoons on 6 April 1797. He commanded a cavalry brigade at the Battle of Castricum in October 1799 during the Anglo-Russian invasion of Holland.

Paget was promoted to major-general on 29 April 1802 and lieutenant-general on 25 April 1808. He commanded the cavalry for Sir John Moore's army in Spain; his cavalry showed distinct superiority over their French counterparts at the Battle of Sahagún in December 1808, where his men captured two French lieutenant colonels and so mauled the French chasseurs that they ceased to exist as a viable regiment. He also commanded the cavalry at the Battle of Benavente later in December 1808, where he defeated the elite chasseurs of the French Imperial Guard, and then commanded the cavalry again during the Retreat to Corunna in January 1809. This was his last service in the Peninsular War, because his liaison with Lady Charlotte, the wife of Henry Wellesley, afterwards Lord Cowley, made it impossible subsequently for him to serve with Wellington, Wellesley's brother. His only war service from 1809 to 1815 was in the disastrous Walcheren expedition in 1809, during which he commanded an infantry division. In 1810 he was divorced and then married Lady Charlotte, who had been divorced from her husband around the same time. He inherited the title of Earl of Uxbridge on his father's death in March 1812 and was appointed a Knight Grand Cross of the Order of the Bath on 4 January 1815.

Waterloo

During the Hundred Days he was appointed cavalry commander in Belgium, under the still resentful eye of Wellington. He fought at the Battle of Quatre Bras on 16 June 1815 and at the Battle of Waterloo two days later, when he led the spectacular charge of the British heavy cavalry against Comte d'Erlon's column which checked and in part routed the French Army.

One of the last cannon shots fired that day hit Paget in the right leg, necessitating its amputation. According to anecdote, he was close to Wellington when his leg was hit, and exclaimed, "By God, sir, I've lost my leg!" – to which Wellington replied, "By God, sir, so you have!" According to his aide-de-camp, Thomas Wildman, during the amputation Paget smiled and said, "I have had a pretty long run. I have been a beau these 47 years and it would not be fair to cut the young men out any longer." While Paget had an articulated artificial limb fitted, "Lord Uxbridge's leg" meanwhile had a somewhat macabre after-life as a tourist attraction in the village of Waterloo in Belgium, to which it had been removed and where it was later interred. The prosthetic legs he had commissioned (from one James Potts) which had movable joints became known as 'Anglesey legs' and he is credited with popularising the style. He also became known as 'One-Leg'.

Paget was created Marquess of Anglesey on 4 July 1815. He was also appointed a Knight of the Garter on 13 March 1818 and promoted to full general on 12 August 1819.

Social life
Paget was the commodore of the Royal Irish Yacht Club, based at Sackville Street, Dublin (now O'Connell Street) in 1832 at the time when he served as lord-lieutenant of Ireland.

Later career
Paget's support of the proceedings against Queen Caroline, alleging her infidelity, made him for a time unpopular, and when he was on one occasion beset by a crowd, who compelled him to shout "The Queen!", he added the wish, "May all your wives be like her". At the coronation of George IV in July 1821, Paget acted as Lord High Steward of England. He was also given the additional honour of captain of Cowes Castle on 25 March 1826. In April 1827, he became a member of the Canningite Government, taking the post of Master-General of the Ordnance. Under the Wellington ministry, he accepted the appointment of Lord Lieutenant of Ireland in February 1828.

In December 1828, Paget addressed a letter to Patrick Curtis, the Roman Catholic primate of Ireland, stating his belief in the need for Catholic emancipation, which led to his recall by the government; on the formation of Earl Grey's administration in November 1830, he again became Lord-Lieutenant of Ireland. In this capacity he introduced state-aided education for 400,000 children. In July 1833, the ministry resigned over the Irish question. Still an impressive horseman even with a cork leg, George Whyte-Melville recalled the crowds that formed to cheer Paget as his well-ridden hack wended the London route from Piccadilly into Albemarle Street. Paget spent the following thirteen years out of office, then joined Lord John Russell's administration as Master-General of the Ordnance in July 1846. He was promoted to field-marshal on 9 November 1846 and, having been appointed Lord Lieutenant of Staffordshire on 31 January 1849, he finally retired from the Government in March 1852.

Paget also served as honorary colonel of the 7th Light Dragoons and later of the Royal Horse Guards. He died of a stroke at Uxbridge House in Burlington Gardens on 29 April 1854 and was buried at Lichfield Cathedral, where a monument is erected to his honour. He was succeeded by his eldest son from his first marriage, Henry.

Family
Paget was first married on 5 July 1795 in London to Lady Caroline Elizabeth Villiers (16 December 1774 – 16 June 1835), daughter of George Villiers, 4th Earl of Jersey and Frances Villiers, Countess of Jersey. They had eight children:

Lady Caroline Paget (6 June 1796 – 12 March 1874); married Charles Gordon-Lennox, 5th Duke of Richmond. With her half-sister Lady Adelaide, she was one of the train-bearers to Queen Victoria at the 1838 coronation.
Henry Paget, 2nd Marquess of Anglesey (6 July 1797 – 7 February 1869); married Eleanora Campbell, granddaughter of John Campbell, 5th Duke of Argyll
Lady Jane Paget (13 October 1798 – 28 January 1876); married Francis Conyngham, 2nd Marquess Conyngham.
Lady Georgina Paget (29 August 1800 – 9 November 1875); married Edward Crofton, 2nd Baron Crofton.
Lady Augusta Paget (26 January 1802 – 6 June 1872); married Arthur Chichester, 1st Baron Templemore.
Captain Lord William Paget RN (1 March 1803 – 17 May 1873); married Frances de Rottenburg, daughter of Francis de Rottenburg
Lady Agnes Paget (11 February 1804 – 9 October 1845); married George Byng, 2nd Earl of Strafford; they were parents to George Byng, 3rd Earl of Strafford, Henry Byng, 4th Earl of Strafford and Francis Byng, 5th Earl of Strafford
Lord Arthur Paget (31 January 1805 – 28 December 1825)

In 1809, Paget scandalously eloped with Lady Charlotte Cadogan (born 12 July 1781), the wife of Henry Wellesley and daughter of Charles Cadogan, 1st Earl Cadogan and Mary Churchill. On 28March 1809, Charlotte's brother, Henry Cadogan, challenged Paget to a duel:
"My Lord, I hereby request you to name a time and place where I may meet you, to obtain satisfaction for the injury done myself and my whole family by your conduct to my sister. I have to add that the time must be as early as possible, and the place not in the immediate neighbourhood of London, as it is by concealment alone that I am able to evade the Police."

The contest took place on Wimbledon Common on the morning of 30May with Hussey Vivian as Lord Paget's second and Captain McKenzie as Cadogan's. Both men discharged their pistols, honour was satisfied and the parties left the field uninjured.

Caroline Paget divorced her husband on 29 November 1810, after which he married Lady Charlotte. They had ten children, of whom seven survived infancy:

Lady Emily Paget (4 March 1810 – 6 March 1893); married John Townshend, 1st Earl Sydney.
Lord Clarence Paget (17 June 1811 – 22 March 1895); married Martha Stuart, the youngest daughter of Admiral Sir Robert Otway.
Lady Mary Paget (16 June 1812 – 20 February 1859); married John Montagu, 7th Earl of Sandwich. They were parents of Edward Montagu, 8th Earl of Sandwich.
Lord Alfred Paget (29 June 1816 – 24 August 1888); married Cecilia, second daughter and co-heiress of George Thomas Wyndham, of Cromer Hall, Norfolk in 1847.
Lord George Paget (16 March 1818 – 30 June 1880); a brigadier general of the British Army.
Lady Adelaide Paget (January 1820 – 21 August 1890); married Frederick William Cadogan, a son of George Cadogan, 3rd Earl Cadogan and his wife Honoria Louisa Blake. She wrote the first book of patience games in the English language as well as other books and plays.
Lord Albert Paget (December 1821 – April 1822)
Lord Albert Paget (29 May 1823 – died in infancy)
Lady Eleanor Paget (21 May 1825 – died in infancy)

References

Sources

Attribution:

Further reading

External links
 
 
 

|-

|-

1768 births
1854 deaths
 
Alumni of Christ Church, Oxford
Welsh amputees
People of the Battle of Waterloo
British Army personnel of the French Revolutionary Wars
British Army commanders of the Napoleonic Wars
British field marshals
Burials at Lichfield Cathedral
Knights of the Garter
Knights Grand Cross of the Order of the Bath
Lord High Stewards
Lord-Lieutenants of Anglesey
Lord-Lieutenants of Staffordshire
Lords Lieutenant of Ireland
People educated at Westminster School, London
7th Queen's Own Hussars officers
Royal Horse Guards officers
South Staffordshire Regiment officers
16th The Queen's Lancers officers
Members of the Parliament of Great Britain for Welsh constituencies
Members of the Parliament of Great Britain for English constituencies
British MPs 1790–1796
British MPs 1796–1800
Members of the Parliament of the United Kingdom for English constituencies
UK MPs 1801–1802
UK MPs 1802–1806
UK MPs 1806–1807
UK MPs 1807–1812
UK MPs who inherited peerages
UK MPs who were granted peerages
Recipients of the Army Gold Cross
Henry
Recipients of the Order of St. George of the Second Degree
Knights Commander of the Military Order of William
Commanders Cross of the Military Order of Maria Theresa
English amputees
Royalty and nobility with disabilities
Recipients of the Waterloo Medal
Members of the Privy Council of the United Kingdom
1
Members of Parliament for Caernarfon
British duellists
Military personnel from London
Earls of Uxbridge